Queen Arwa University is a Yemeni private university founded in 1996 in Yemen and named after Queen Arwa. The university's different fields of study include humanities and social sciences, commercial sciences and administration, engineering, science, higher education, art, law, and microbiology.

About 
Queen Arwa University was established in January 1996. It gained recognition by the Ministry of Education and the Council of Higher Education Resolution No.(1). The first license was obtained with the establishment of the Yemeni International Languages Institute in 1989. In 1994, the institute established the International Yemeni Institute for Development. In 1995 the university laid the foundation for its first college, the College of Technical Sciences.

Objectives 
The main objectives of the university are:
.
 Developing different, yet specialized courses in higher education in cooperation with other educational institutions.
 Providing other social and scientific establishments with specialists in different areas of development, particularly in the fields of Women Studies, Environmental Studies, and Population Sciences.
 Implementing educational programs to enable students to keep pace with advancements in technology, the arts, and sciences.
 Forging cultural and scientific links and exchanges with universities, institutes, and scientific establishments in the Arab world, as well as abroad.

Certificates 
Queen Arwa University offers the following certificates:

 BA Degree after the completion of four successful academic years
 Intermediate Diploma after the completion of two successful academic years
 Higher Diploma following the BA Degree after the completion of one successful year
 MA in Arts, Economy and Law after two intensive courses and research

Academic colleges

College of Humanities and Social Sciences 
 Departments of Arabic and English Languages
 Departments of Sociology and Anthropology
 Department of Social and Psychological Services

College of Commercial Sciences and Administration 
 Department of Management
 Department of Accounting
 Department of Marketing
 Department of Secretarial Studies
 Department of Political Sciences
 Department of Secretarial Studies (two academic years)

College of Engineering 
 Department of Decoration Engineering
 Department of Computer Engineering
 Department of Architectural Engineering

College of Science 
 Department of Computer
 Department of Mathematics

College of Higher Education 
 Department of Psychology 
 Department of Women Studies
 Department of Social Services 
 Department of Educational Administration
 Department of Managerial Development

College of Educational 
 Department of Educational Social Services
 Department of Special Education

College of Art 

 Department of Islamic Studies
 Department of Library
 Department of Tourism
 Department of Public Relation
 Department of Library Sciences (two academic years)
 Department of Tourism (two academic years)

College of Law 
 Department of General Law
 Department of International Law

College of Microbiology

External links 
 University website
 University's YouTube page

References

Universities in Yemen
Educational institutions established in 1996
1996 establishments in Yemen